Rockliff is a surname. Notable people with the surname include:

 Jeremy Rockliff (born 1970), Australian politician
 Mara Rockliff, American author 
 Tom Rockliff (born 1990), Australian rules footballer

See also
 Rockcliff (disambiguation)
 Rockcliffe (disambiguation)
 Rockliffe (disambiguation)